Meristoderes is a genus of kinorhynchs in the family Echinoderidae.

Species
Meristoderes elleae Sørensen, Rho, Min, Kim & Chang, 2013
Meristoderes galatheae Herranz, Thormar, Benito, Sánchez & Pardos, 2012
Meristoderes glaber Sørensen, Rho, Min, Kim & Chang, 2013
Meristoderes herranzae Sørensen, Rho, Min, Kim & Chang, 2013
Meristoderes imugi Sørensen, Rho, Min, Kim & Chang, 2013
Meristoderes macracanthus Herranz, Thormar, Benito, Sánchez & Pardos, 2012

References

Kinorhyncha
Ecdysozoa genera